

Public
University of Sarajevo (Sarajevo); 
University of East Sarajevo (East Sarajevo);

Private (including standalone faculties and high colleges)
 International University of Sarajevo (Sarajevo); 
 Sarajevo School of Science and Technology (Sarajevo); 
 International Burch University (Sarajevo); 
 American University in Bosnia and Herzegovina (Sarajevo and Tuzla) ; 

Universities
Sarajevo

 
Universities